KXBX may refer to:

 KXBX (AM), a radio station (1270 AM) licensed to Lakeport, California, United States
 KXBX-FM, a radio station (98.3 FM) licensed to Lakeport, California, United States